Jan Rozmanowski (born 12 February 1999), known professionally as Jann, is a Polish singer and songwriter.

Early life 
He was born in Lublin and grew up in Garwolin. He is the son of Edyta and Jacek Rozmanowski. He is the fourth of eight siblings, with two older sisters Antonina and Amelia, older brother Maciej, and two younger brothers Franciszek and Maksymilian and younger sisters Zuzanna and Lena. In 2013, the family participated in the first season of Polsat's reality television show Nasz nowy dom.

Career 
At the age of 12, he sang at Grand Theatre in Warsaw. For three years, he attended the Music School in Garwolin, which he didn't finish, because at the age of 16 he moved with his parents to the city of Newry in Great Britain, where he continued his education at the Flynn Performing Arts School. He then studied vocals at the British and Irish Modern Music Institute in London from 2018 to 2021. 

He currently lives in Warsaw. On November 5, 2020, he released his debut single "Do You Wanna Come Over?" In 2022, he released his debut mini-album entitled Power and performed at the Off Festival and the Great September festival. He also gave concerts in Budapest during BUSH2022 and in Bratislava. He performed as a supporting act during Ralph Kaminski's tour. On February 26, 2023, with the song "Gladiator", he participated in the final of Tu bije serce Europy! Wybieramy hit na Eurowizję!, the Polish national selection for the Eurovision Song Contest 2023. He finished 2nd in the final with 19 points, receiving the maximum points from the Polish televoters.

Discography

EPs

Singles

References 

Polish singers
Polish male singers
Living people
1999 births